The second season of American Idol premiered on January 21, 2003, and continued until May 21, 2003. The title of show was shortened from American Idol: The Search for a Superstar of Season 1 to just American Idol.  Brian Dunkleman quit after the first season, and Ryan Seacrest therefore became the lone host in Season 2 as well as all subsequent seasons.  Kristin Holt was a special correspondent.

The second season was won by Ruben Studdard, who defeated Clay Aiken by 134,000 votes out of the 24 million votes recorded, in the closest finale vote winning margin ever recorded in the show's history. It was the first season to crown a male winner and the first season to have a finale with two male contestants. It was also the first season to feature a Wild Card contestant (Aiken) in the finale, followed by the thirteenth season.

Studdard released his coronation song "Flying Without Wings" after the show and reached number two on the U.S. Billboard Hot 100. Aiken also released a single with "This Is the Night", written by Chris Braide, Aldo Nova and Gary Burr. It became the first non-winning contestant to have a Billboard Hot 100 number-one. It was also the biggest US single of 2003, selling over one million copies and reaching six times platinum status in Canada as well as number 1 in New Zealand.

In addition to Studdard and Aiken, Kimberley Locke, Joshua Gracin, Kimberly Caldwell, and Carmen Rasmusen have signed with various record labels.

Regional auditions
Auditions were held in the fall of 2002 in the following cities:

The number of auditioners increased significantly after the success of the first season, and arenas and stadiums started to be used to hold the first auditions from this season onwards when the Rose Bowl in Pasadena was used this season instead of the hotel originally planned.  Around 70,000 attended the auditions this season and 234 were selected to proceed on to the Hollywood round.  Radio DJ Angie Martinez was originally signed up as a fourth judge, but quit after a few days, stating that "it became too uncomfortable for me to tell someone else to give up on their dream".  Paula Abdul was absent from the Atlanta audition.

At the Miami auditions, one failed auditioner was Edgar Nova who, after being rejected, tried to get back again and had to be escorted off the premise.  Nova then auditioned in Los Angeles, but with a different hairstyle to avoid recognition, and was again unsuccessful.

Another auditioner named Bryan Washington auditioned in Atlanta, Georgia, and made it to Hollywood, but did not make it into the top 32. He was also overweight at the time of his American Idol audition, and later became a contestant on The Biggest Loser (Season 4.)

Auditioner Amber Riley was rejected by producers and did not get to audition for the judges, but later went on to co-star on the television series Glee as Mercedes Jones.

Hollywood week
The contestants performed in a series of rounds and the number of contestants trimmed was in each round.  In the first round, the 234 contestants performed a song, after which 114 of them were eliminated. In the second round, the remaining 120 contestants were asked to compose a melody for one of five sets of lyrics, and 40 more were cut. In the third round, the contestants were separated by gender and performed in small groups. The remaining 48 boys chose from The Carpenters' "Superstar", Seal's "Kiss from a Rose", and Barry Manilow's "Tryin' to Get the Feeling Again", while the remaining 32 girls chose from Melissa Manchester's "Don't Cry Out Loud", Freda Payne's "Band of Gold", and Dionne Warwick's "You'll Never Get to Heaven (If You Break My Heart)".  During his group's performance, Corey Clark, who would later claim a relationship with Paula Abdul, sang to Paula directly and kissed her hand.

In the last round, each of the remaining 48 contestants performed solo.  After their performances, the contestants were then divided into three groups of sixteen and placed in separate rooms.  One group was eliminated, and 32 contestants proceeded on to the semi-final rounds.

Semi-finals
The format changed slightly in Season 2; instead of three groups of ten, the semi-finalists were grouped into four groups of eight.  The singers performed solo in a new improved stage with piano accompaniment by Michael Orland, and the performance pre-taped.  There were no live audience although family members of contestants were present in the Red Room where the contestants were placed.

The results of the public vote were announced live the next day.  From each group, two were selected to proceed on to the top 12, and those selected reprised their performance in the result show. Nine of those who failed at any of previous stages (including the Hollywood rounds and the initial regional auditions) were given one more chance to perform again in the wild-card show.  Each of the three judges put one contestant from the wild-card group through to the top 12, with the final one selected by the public vote.

Color key:

Group 1

Group 2

Group 3

Group 4

Wild Card

Finals
In this season, guests were introduced as celebrity judges, some of whom who may also act as a mentor in for the week they were on.

On March 31, 2003, during what would it be Top 9, it was announced that Corey Clark had been disqualified.

In most weeks the bottom vote-getter performed his or her song again after their elimination was announced, but at Top 5 and Top 8 both the bottom 2 vote-getters performed their song.

Color key:

Top 12 – Motown
Lamont Dozier served as the guest mentor this week.

Top 11 – Movie Soundtracks
Gladys Knight served as the guest mentor this week.

Top 10 – Country rock
Olivia Newton-John served as the guest mentor this week.

Top 8 (first week) – Disco
Verdine White served as the guest mentor this week.

Top 8 (second week) – Billboard Number Ones
Lionel Richie served as the guest mentor this week.

Top 7 – Billy Joel
Smokey Robinson served as the guest mentor this week.

Top 6 – Diane Warren
Diane Warren served as this week's guest mentor and judge.

Top 5 – 1960s/Neil Sedaka
Neil Sedaka served as a guest judge this week.

Top 4 – Bee Gees
Robin Gibb served as a guest judge this week.

Top 3 – Random from a bowl of Producers' picks, Judges' Choice, Idol's Choice

Top 2 – Finale
The two finalists sing three songs. After the finale in which Studdard won the season ahead of Aiken, the margin was just 134,000 votes cast out of the 24 million votes recorded, creating a controversy.

Elimination chart
Color key:

Finalists

Ruben Studdard (born September 12, 1978, in Frankfurt, Germany, 24 years old at the time of the show) is from  Birmingham, Alabama and auditioned in Nashville, Tennessee with  Stevie Wonder's "Ribbon in the Sky".
Clay Aiken (born November 30, 1978, in Raleigh, North Carolina, 24 years old at the time of the show) auditioned in Atlanta, Georgia with Heatwave's "Always and Forever". He studied at the University of North Carolina at Charlotte, where he graduated with a degree in special education.
Kimberley Locke (born January 3, 1978, in Hartsville, Tennessee, 25 at the time of the show) is from Nashville, Tennessee where she auditioned with Judy Garland's "Over the Rainbow".
Joshua Gracin (born October 18, 1980, in Westland, Michigan, 22 years old at the time of the show) is from Oceanside, California, where he was stationed while serving in the Marine Corps.  He auditioned in Los Angeles with O-Town's "All or Nothing".
Trenyce (born March 31, 1980, in Memphis, Tennessee, 22 years old at the start of the season) is from Bartlett, Tennessee and auditioned in Nashville with Whitney Houston's "I Learned from the Best".  She turned down a record deal at 14 and she auditioned using her full name, LaShundra "Trenyce" Cobbins.
Carmen Rasmusen (born March 25, 1985, in Edmonton, Alberta in Canada, 17 at the start of the season) is from Bountiful, Utah and auditioned in Los Angeles.  She did not make the semi-final initially but was brought back for the wild card show and put through to the final.
Kimberly Caldwell (born February 25, 1982, in Katy, Texas, 20 at the start of the season) – Prior to American Idol, she had appeared on Star Search, where she won five times as a junior vocalist, and in Popstars: USA.
Rickey Smith (May 10, 1979 - May 6, 2016, born in Keene, Texas, 23 at the time of the show) auditioned in Nashville with Brian McKnight's "One Last Cry".  He worked as a teacher before the show. Smith was killed in a car crash on May 6, 2016, making him the second American Idol finalist to die after seventh season finalist, Michael Johns.
Corey Clark (born July 13, 1980, in San Bernardino, California, 22 at the time of the show) is from San Bernardino, California, and auditioned in Nashville with Jackson 5's "Never Can Say Goodbye".  He was disqualified hours after the website The Smoking Gun revealed his misdemeanor charges of battery and resisting arrest on March 31, 2003.
Julia DeMato (born March 7, 1979, in Danbury, Connecticut, 23 at the start of the show) is from Brookfield, Connecticut and auditioned with Toni Braxton's Un-Break My Heart.
Charles Grigsby (born September 15, 1978, in Oberlin, Ohio, 24 at the time of the show) auditioned in Detroit.
Vanessa Olivarez (born April 7, 1981, 21 at the time of the show) is from Atlanta, Georgia and auditioned in Atlanta with Queen's "Bohemian Rhapsody".

Controversies
The finale vote had been controversial due to the smallness of the margin. Ryan Seacrest also added fuel by mistakenly announcing the difference in vote count first as 13,000, then 1,335, but eventually revealed later to be around 130,000.  There was much discussion in the communication industry about the phone system being overloaded, and that more than 150 million votes were dropped, making the voting results suspect.  In an interview prior to the start of the fifth season, executive producer Nigel Lythgoe revealed that Aiken had led the fan voting from the wild card week onward until the finale.

There was controversy when contestant Frenchie Davis was disqualified from the competition after topless photos of her surfaced on the Internet. Shortly afterwards, she landed a role in the Broadway musical Rent.

Corey Clark was also disqualified from the show because, according to the Idol producers, Clark had a police record he had not disclosed to the show.  However, in 2005, contestant Corey Clark alleged in an interview on ABC's Primetime Live and in a book, They Told Me to Tell the Truth, So... The Sex, Lies and Paulatics of One of America's Idols, that he and judge Paula Abdul had an affair while he was on the show and that this contributed to his removal. Clark also alleged that Abdul gave him preferential treatment on the show and tips on song choice.  A subsequent investigation by an independent counsel hired by Fox "could not corroborate the evidence or allegations provided by Mr. Clark or any witnesses".  Paula Abdul was therefore considered exonerated but an "enhanced non-fraternization policy" was put in place after the investigation.

Trenyce was also found to have been arrested on felony theft charge; however, Nigel Lythgoe considered her offense to be minor and one which she has been honest about, therefore "warranted no concern regarding her participation in the show."

During the Top 10, a problem with the telephone system resulted in some votes not being registered for Julia DeMato; however, Fox insisted that the mistake would not have made any difference in Julia DeMato being voted off.

During the course of the contest, Studdard became known for wearing 205 Flava jerseys representing his area code; when asked about them early in the season, Studdard told Seacrest that he was "just representing 205".  Shortly after the end of the contest, Studdard sued 205 Flava, Inc. for $2 Million dollars for using his image for promotional purposes.  205 Flava responded by alleging that Studdard had accepted over $10,000 in return for wearing 205 shirts, and produced eight cashed checks to validate their claim.  The allegations, if true, were a clear violation of the American Idol rules.  The lawsuit was settled out of court.

Some questions were raised about the participation of Joshua Gracin, who was then in the Marine Corps, in American idol during the time of the Iraq War.  He later missed both the finale performance night as well as the Idol tour that year after being recalled to duty by the Marines.

Some speculation about Vanessa Olivarez' dismissal and treatment by American Idol surfaced in 2007. During the show, Olivarez took part in a scripted joke where, after Seacrest had asked Olivarez to read a cue card taking the viewers to a commercial, Olivarez would reply by saying, "Ryan, I'm a real artist, not a performing monkey like you, so why don't you read your own script?"  However, viewers booed, and Olivarez was voted off afterwards, a result of what some thought to be negative public perception of her due to the joke. It was suggested that she was deliberately ousted because she had come out as a lesbian to other contestants. She had also posed nude for an ad campaign for the animal rights group PETA after she was voted off.  Olivarez was the only finalist omitted from the Season 2 CD, and she was not chosen for the tour after Joshua Gracin was recalled to the Marines.

U.S. Nielsen ratings 
The number of average viewers per episode this season was 21.7 million, an increase of 71% over season 1.  Its Wednesday episodes finished as the third most-watched show of the year averaging 21.93 million, and the Tuesday episodes fifth at 21.56 million.  The show ranked second in the coveted 18/49 demographic for the 2002-2003 season. This season's finale episode still ranks as the most-watched single episode in Idol history at 38.1 million, the finale night itself averaged 33.7 million when the pre-show special is taken into consideration.  The show also helped Fox become the season's number three network in total viewers for the first time.

A couple of specials were aired later in the year - From Justin To Kelly: The Rise of Two American Idols on June 20, 2003, and American Idol: Christmas Songs on November 25, 2003, the latter of which was ranked number 30 with total viewer number of 10.9 million, and number 28 in the 18/49 demo with a 4.1 rating.

Releases

Compilations
American Idol Season 2: All-Time Classic American Love Songs (Album, 2003)
American Idol: The Great Holiday Classics (Feat. Ruben Studdard, Clay Aiken, Kimberley Locke - Album, 2003)
American Christmas (Feat. Trenyce, Frenchie Davis - Album, 2008)

Ruben Studdard
"Flying Without Wings"/"Superstar" (Single, 2003)
Soulful (Album, 2003)
"Sorry 2004" (Single, 2003)
"What If" (Single, 2004)
I Need an Angel (Album, 2004)
The Return (Album, 2006)
 "Change Me" (Single,  2006)
 "Make Ya Feel Beautiful" (Single, 2007)
 "Celebrate Me Home" (Single, 2008)
 Love Is (Album, 2009)
 "Together" (Single, 2009)
 "Don't Make 'Em Like U No More" (Single, 2009)
 Playlist: The Very Best of Ruben Studdard (Album, 2010)
 Letters from Birmingham (Album, 2012)
 "June 28th (I'm Single)" (Single, 2012)
 Unconditional Love (Album, 2014)
 Ruben Sings Luther (Album, 2018)

Clay Aiken
"Bridge over Troubled Water"/"This Is the Night" (Single, 2003)
Measure of a Man (Album, 2003)
 "Invisible" (Single, 2003)
"The Way/Solitaire" (Single, 2004)
Merry Christmas with Love (Album, 2004)
 "Winter Wonderland" (Single, 2004)
 "O Holy Night" (Single, 2004)
 "Hark the Herald Angels Sing / O Come All Ye Faithful" (Single, 2005)
 "Have Yourself a Merry Little Christmas" (Single, 2005)
 "Mary, Did You Know?" (Single, 2005)
A Thousand Different Ways (Album, 2006)
 "Without You" (Single, 2006)
 "A Thousand Days" (Single, 2006)
All Is Well(EP, 2006)
On My Way Here (Album, 2008)
 The Very Best of Clay Aiken (Album, 2009)
Tried and True (Album, 2010)

Kimberley Locke
"8th World Wonder" (Single, 2004)
One Love (Album, 2004)
"Wrong" (Single, 2004)
"Coulda Been" (Single, 2005)
 "Up on the House Top" (Single, 2005)
 "Jingle Bells" (Single, 2006)
Based on a True Story (Album, 2007)
 "Change" (Single, 2007)
 "Band of Gold" (Single, 2007)
 Christmas (Album, 2007)
 "Frosty the Snowman" (Single, 2007)
 "Fall" (Single, 2008)
 "We Need a Little Christmas" (Single, 2008)
 "Strobelight" (Single, 2010)
 Four for the Floor (EP, 2011)
 "Finally Free" (Single, 2012)
 You're My Baby (Album, 2021)

Josh Gracin
Josh Gracin (Album, 2004)
 "I Want to Live" (Single, 2004)
 "Nothin' to Lose" (Single, 2004)
 "Stay with Me (Brass Bed)" (Single, 2005)
'"Favorite State of Mind" (Single, 2006)
 "I Keep Coming Back" (Single, 2007)
We Weren't Crazy (Album, 2008)
 "Enough" (Single, 2009)
 "She's a Different Kind of Crazy" (Single, 2009)
 "Over Me" (Single, 2010)
 "Cover Girl" (Single, 2010)
 Redemption (Album, 2011)
 "Long Way to Go" (Single, 2011)
Nothin Like Us, Pt 1 (EP, 2017)

Carmen Rasmusen
"Photograph" (Single, 2004)
Carmen (EP, 2004)
"Nothin' Like the Summer" (Single, 2007)
Nothin' Like the Summer (Album, 2007)

Kimberly Caldwell
 "Who Will You Run To" (Single, 2006)
 "Fear of Flying" (Single, 2008)
"Mess of You" (Single, 2009)
"Desperate Boys and Stupid Girls" (Single, 2010)
Without Regret (Album, 2011)
 "On the Weekend" (Single, 2014)
 "Tied Together" (Single, 2014)
 "Doin' Me Right" (Single, 2014)

Corey Clark
Corey Clark (Album, 2005)
"Loves Melody" (Single, 2013)
"Color Me" (Single, 2019)
"Naughty Boy" (Single, 2020)
"Protect Me" (Single, 2021)

Charles Grigsby
Charles Grigsby (EP, 2005)
 "Headliner" (Single, 2011)

Vanessa Olivarez
"The One" (Single, 2003)
 "As Vain As You" (Single, 2004)
 Butterfly Stitch (Vanessa's band Butterfly Stitch - EP, 2007)
 Butterfly Stitch – Live at The Loft (Vanessa's band Butterfly Stitch - Album, 2007)
"The One" (Remixes, 2008)
Granville Automatic (Vanessa's band Granville Automatic - Album, 2012)
Live from Sun Studio (Vanessa's band Granville Automatic- Album, 2012)

Other Contestants
Jordan (Jordan Segundo - Album, 2004)
Christmas in a Fishbowl (Feat. JD Adams - Album, 2004)
Use Your Gift (Quiana Parler - Album, 2005)
Voyces United for UNHCR (Feat. Candice Coleman – Album, 2006)
George Trice (George Trice - Album, 2008)

Source: Idolsmusic.com

External links
Official American Idol Contestants Website

See also
 American Idol
 American Idols LIVE! Tour 2003

References

American Idol seasons
2003 American television seasons